The individual dressage competition of the equestrian events at the 2019 Pan American Games took place 28–31 July 2019 at the Equestrian Club Militar La Molina in Lima.

The first round of the individual dressage competition was the  FEI Prix St. Georges Test and the Grand Prix. The second round was the Intermediate I Test and the Grand Prix Special. The best 18 riders, with a maximum of three riders per country, from this second round qualified for the individual final, the third round. The third and last round was the individual final with the Intermediate I Freestyle and the Grand Prix Freestyle. The best three countries in the team ranking received a team spot for the Olympic Games in Tokyo 2020.

Schedule
All times are Central Standard Time (UTC-7).

Judges
Appointment of Dressage judges was as follows:

Dressage
  Eduard de Wolff van Westerrode (Ground Jury President)
  Janet Lee Foy (Ground Jury Member)
  Mary Seefried (Ground Jury Member)
  Thomas Kessler (Ground Jury Member)
  Brenda Minor (Ground Jury Member)
  Maribel Alonso de Quinzanos (Ground Jury Member)
  Marian Cunningham (Appeal Committee Member)
  Gabriele Teusche de Noble (Appeal Committee Member)

Results
The results were as follows:

Qualification

Final round

References

Equestrian at the 2019 Pan American Games